BAY 60-7550 is a  type 2 phosphodiesterase inhibitor.

References

Phosphodiesterase inhibitors